Alexander Mackie may refer to:

Alex Mackie (fl. 1900s), Scottish football manager (Sunderland)
Alec Mackie (1903–1984), Northern Irish footballer (Arsenal, Portsmouth)
Alec Mackie (Scottish footballer) (fl. 1900s), Scottish footballer  (Rangers)
 Alexander Mackie, founder of Albyn School, Aberdeen, Scotland
 Alexander Mackie (Australian academic) (1876–1955), first Professor of Education at the University of Sydney
 Alexander Brown Mackie (1894–1966), American college professor, business college founder, and college sports coach